The 2018–19 TCU Horned Frogs men's basketball team represented Texas Christian University in the 2018–19 NCAA Division I men's basketball season, led by head coach Jamie Dixon in his third season at TCU. The Horned Frogs competed as members of the Big 12 Conference and played their home games at Schollmaier Arena in Fort Worth, Texas.  They finished the season 23-14, 7-11 to tie for 7th place.  As the No. 8 seed in the Big 12 Tournament, they defeated Oklahoma State in the first round before losing to Kansas State in the quarterfinals. They received an at-large bid to the NIT where they defeated Sam Houston State, Nebraska and Creighton to advance to the semifinals where they lost to in conference member Texas.

Previous season
They finished the season 21–12, 9–9 in Big 12 play to finish in fifth place. They lost in the quarterfinals of the Big 12 tournament to Kansas State. They received an at-large bid to the NCAA tournament for the first time since 1998 as the No. 6 seed in the Midwest region where they lost in the first round to Syracuse.

Preseason

Offseason

Departures

Incoming transfers

Recruits

Recruiting class of 2018

Recruiting class of 2019

Roster

Schedule and results

|-
!colspan=9 style=| Regular season

|-
!colspan=9 style=| Big 12 tournament

|-
!colspan=9 style=| NIT tournament

Schedule Source: GoFrogs.com

Rankings

^Coaches did not release a Week 2 poll.

References

Tcu
TCU Horned Frogs men's basketball seasons
TCU